The Jurca Gnatsum is a French homebuilt near scale replica aircraft based on the North American P-51 Mustang.

Design & Development
The Gnatsum (Mustang spelled backwards) is one of many wooden homebuilt designs from Romanian designer Marcel Jurca. Jurca, a Henschel Hs 129 pilot in World War II, expanded his warbird replica designs to include the Allied North American P-51 Mustang fighter.

The Gnatsum is a low-wing, cantilever monoplane with an enclosed single-seat cockpit and manually retractable tailwheel landing gear based on that of the Jurca Sirocco. All versions are constructed from wood with fabric covering, and manufacturing rights to the kit aircraft were acquired by Falconar Avia. Plans for the MJ-77 are available from Avions Marcel Jurca.

Some of the engines suitable for the MJ-7 Gnatsum series are:-
 Ranger 6-440C-5 inline engine
 Menasco C4
 de Havilland Gipsy Major I
 Rambler aluminum block in-line 6
General Motors aluminum V-8

Variants
MJ-7
2/3 scale variant
MJ-7S Solo
Single-seat advanced trainer version of MJ-7, the under-belly scoop inherited from the Mustang design was removed.
MJ-77
MJ-70
Full-scale variant (still under development in 2001 when Jurca died - never completed)

Specifications (Jurca MJ-77 Gnatsum)

See also

References

 
 Janes.com
 Marcel Jurca old website
 www.aircraftworlddirectory.com

External links
 
 Plane and Pilot article
 Falconar Avia Website

1960s French sport aircraft
Homebuilt aircraft
Gnatsum
Single-engined tractor aircraft
Low-wing aircraft
North American P-51 Mustang replicas
Aircraft first flown in 1969